Swoosie Kurtz (born September 6, 1944) is an American actress. She is the recipient of an Emmy Award and two Tony Awards.

Kurtz made her Broadway debut in the 1975 revival of Ah, Wilderness. She has received five Tony Award nominations, winning for both Fifth of July (1981) and The House of Blue Leaves (1986); her other nominations were for Tartuffe (1988), Frozen (2004), and Heartbreak House (2007).

For her television work, she has received eight Emmy Award nominations, with one win for Carol and Company in 1990. Other television credits include the NBC drama Sisters (1991–1996), Huff (2004–2006), Pushing Daisies (2007–2009), and the hit CBS sitcom Mike & Molly (2010–2016). Her films include Wildcats (1986), Dangerous Liaisons (1988), Stanley & Iris (1990), Citizen Ruth (1996), Liar Liar (1997) and Bubble Boy (2001).

Early life
Kurtz was born in Omaha, Nebraska, the only child of author Margaret "Margo" (née Rogers;) and Air Force Colonel Frank Allen Kurtz Jr., a decorated World War II American bomber pilot. She got her first name "Swoosie" (which rhymes with Lucy, rather than woozy) from her father. It is derived from the sole surviving example of the early Boeing B-17D Flying Fortress bomber, named "The Swoose" (half swan, half goose), which her father piloted during World War II.

Career

Kurtz's first television appearance at age 17 was on The Donna Reed Show 4th-season episode "The Golden Trap" (February, 1962). She also appeared on To Tell the Truth at eighteen, identifying her father from two impostors. She made her debut as a series regular on the daytime drama As The World Turns in 1971. Kurtz began her career in theater, making her Broadway debut in the 1975 revival of Ah, Wilderness!. She first gained wide recognition in 1978 for two theatrical productions, Uncommon Women and Others, the breakthrough play by Wendy Wasserstein in which she appeared in a 1977 workshop at the Eugene O'Neill Theater Center and then Off-Broadway, and the musical A History of the American Film for which she won a Drama Desk Award. Kurtz was soon awarded Broadway's "triple crown" (the Tony, Drama Desk, and Outer Critics Circle awards) for her portrayal of Gwen in Lanford Wilson's Fifth of July. She won a second Tony for her performance as Bananas in a 1986 revival of The House of Blue Leaves by John Guare. She starred as playwright Lillian Hellman in the 2002 Nora Ephron play Imaginary Friends.

In 1978, Kurtz was part of the ensemble cast of Mary Tyler Moore's short-lived variety series Mary, that also included David Letterman and Michael Keaton. In 1981, Kurtz began two seasons alongside Tony Randall in the sitcom Love, Sidney, in a role that earned her the first of her 10 Emmy Award nominations. In 1990, she won her first Emmy for a guest-starring role on Carol Burnett's comedy series Carol & Company. 

From 1991 to 1996, Kurtz had her longest-running television role, starring as wealthy divorcee Alex Reed Halsey on the NBC drama Sisters, a role that earned her two more Emmy Award nominations. She also starred in the ABC television series Pushing Daisies as Lily Charles.

In recent years, Kurtz has guest-starred on the hit series ER and Lost and Desperate Housewives and has also had recurring roles as Valerie on the drama That's Life, as Judy's mother Helen on the sitcom Still Standing, as Madeleine Sullivan on the Showtime drama series Huff, and most recently as part of a lesbian married couple with Blythe Danner on the drama series Nurse Jackie. In 2010, Kurtz began starring on the CBS sitcom Mike & Molly as Joyce Flynn.  Kurtz has also appeared in a recurring part as Matt LeBlanc's mother in the comedy series Man with a Plan.  In 2021, she began appearing as Mayim Bialik's mother in the comedy series Call Me Kat.

Although her main focus has been television, Kurtz has starred in several major Hollywood films including the Agatha Christie drama Caribbean Mystery (1983), Dangerous Liaisons (1988), its remake Cruel Intentions (1999), as a lesbian activist in the acclaimed indie film Citizen Ruth (1996), and alongside Jim Carrey in Liar Liar (1997).

Personal life
From 1964 to 1970, Kurtz was romantically involved with Joshua White of The Joshua Light Show.

Filmography

Film

Television

Theatre credits

Awards and nominations

References

External links

 
 
 
 
 

1944 births
Living people
Actresses from Omaha, Nebraska
American people of German descent
American film actresses
American stage actresses
American television actresses
American voice actresses
Drama Desk Award winners
Primetime Emmy Award winners
Tony Award winners
USC School of Dramatic Arts alumni
20th-century American actresses
21st-century American actresses